Brachyderes is a genus in the weevil family (Curculionidae).

Selected species
Brachyderes confusus Viedma, 1967 
Brachyderes grisescens Fairmaire, 1862 
Brachyderes incanus (Linnaeus, 1758) 
Brachyderes lineolatus Fairmaire, 1862 
Brachyderes lusitanicus (Fabricius, 1781) 
Brachyderes marginellus Graells, 1858 
Brachyderes pubescens Boheman, 1833 
Brachyderes rugatus Wollaston, 1864 
Brachyderes suturalis Graells, 1851

References
 Fauna Europaea

Entiminae